Hypericum suffruticosum, known as pineland St. John's-wort, is a species of flowering plant in the St. John's wort family, Hypericaceae. It is native to the Southeastern United States.

Description
The stems are 4-lined when young, exfoliating as it matures, into thin, reddish-brown strips or flakes. The leaf edge (margin) is flat or slightly recurved.

A single flower is produced in each inflorescence. The ovary is two parted.

Distribution and habitat
Hypericum suffruticosum occurs in the Atlantic coastal plain in the southeastern United States, in Alabama, Florida, Georgia, Louisiana, North Carolina, and South Carolina. Its habitat includes dry, open, sandy areas such as pine flatwoods and savannas.

References

suffruticosum
Flora of North America
Plants described in 1961